Zhang Xincheng (born 24 August 1995), also known by his English name Steven Zhang, is a Chinese actor. His first major role was that of Lin Yang in the high school drama My Huckleberry Friends (2017). Zhang is best known for his roles as Li Yubing in the sports drama Skate into Love and He Ziqiu in the family drama Go Ahead, both of which aired in 2020 and garnered him several awards for his work that year.

Early life
Zhang was born and raised in Jingzhou, China. He aspired to be a professional dancer as a child and eventually moved to Beijing in 2008 to attend the Affiliated Secondary School of the Beijing Dance Academy. Zhang notably placed first in college entrance examinations in 2014 for several courses offered by top performing arts colleges in China such as the Central Academy of Drama, Beijing Film Academy, People's Liberation Army Academy of Art and Shanghai Theatre Academy. He subsequently attended the Central Academy of Drama, and graduated with a bachelor's degree in musical theatre.

Career
In 2013, Zhang made his acting debut in the short film School Bus.

In 2014, he released two singles; "Be Here for You" as the soundtrack of the film The Story of Ho Jinye and "Believe Love Still Exists" as the soundtrack of web series Heartbreak Emergency Department. He went on to star in several short films and in 2015, was signed onto the entertainment company EE-Media.

In 2016, Zhang starred in his first television drama Shuttle Love Millennium, where he gained attention for his performance.

In 2017, Zhang starred in the critically acclaimed campus web drama My Huckleberry Friends. He won the Best New Actor award at the iQiyi All-Star Carnival for his performance.

In 2018, Zhang starred in the esports drama The Strongest Men of God.

In 2019, Zhang starred in the youth historical drama Young Blood.

In 2020, Zhang starred in the hit sports romance drama Skate into Love, alongside Janice Wu, portraying a collegiate ice hockey player. He then starred in music romance drama Symphony's Romance, adapted from the Japanese manga Nodame Cantabile; playing a genius conductor. Zhang also starred in and helped produce the slice-of-life family drama Go Ahead. Forbes China listed him in their 30 Under 30 list for 2020 which consisted of 30 influential people under 30 years old who have had a substantial effect in their fields.
 
In 2021, Zhang participated in the sixth season of Star Detective; on February 28, he was awarded Weibo's Enterprising Artist of the Year at the 2020 Sina Weibo Night in Shanghai. In May, he starred in the TV series The Abyss, alongside Xinbo Fu; Zhang starred in the romantic comedy The Day of Becoming You alongside Liang Jie. It was broadcast June 17. On September 8, Zhang starred in the commercial war drama of the Republic of China Light alongside Cai Wenjing and Zhang Xuehan; it was broadcast on Hunan Satellite TV. On October 16, Taihe Maitian Music Group jointly launched a large-scale documentary Forbidden City soundtrack album. The announced singer lineup included Zhang Xincheng. In December, he joined the 2021-2022 Hunan Satellite TV New Year’s Eve Gala, and performed "Red Ling" with Chinese music artist Fang Jinlong at the New Year's Eve Party.

Filmography

Film

Television series

Variety show

Discography

Awards and nominations

References

External links
 

1995 births
Living people
Central Academy of Drama alumni
Male actors from Hubei
Singers from Hubei
21st-century Chinese male actors
Chinese male television actors
21st-century Chinese male singers
Chinese television presenters
Chinese broadcasters
VJs (media personalities)